Aleksandr Pavlovets (born 13 August 1996) is a Belarusian professional footballer who plays as a centre-back for Greek Super League club Lamia, on loan from the Russian side Orenburg.

Club career
On 2 September 2020, Russian Premier League club FC Rostov announced that they signed a contract with Pavlovets that will begin after his contract with Dinamo Brest expires in the winter of 2020–21. On 14 October 2020, Rostov confirmed that he will join the club before the Russian transfer window closes on 19 October. On 7 July 2021, he was loaned to Kolos Kovalivka for the 2021–22 season. On 22 April 2022, Pavlovets moved on loan to Warta Poznań in Poland until the end of June 2022.

On 16 June 2022, Pavlovets moved to Orenburg. On 18 January 2023, Pavlovets joined PAS Lamia 1964 in Greece on loan.

Honours
Torpedo-BelAZ Zhodino
Belarusian Cup winner: 2015–16

Dinamo Brest
Belarusian Premier League champion: 2019
Belarusian Super Cup winner: 2019, 2020

Career statistics

References

External links
 
 
 Profile at BATE website

1996 births
People from Barysaw
Sportspeople from Minsk Region
Living people
Belarusian footballers
Belarus youth international footballers
Belarus under-21 international footballers
Belarus international footballers
Association football defenders
FC BATE Borisov players
FC Torpedo-BelAZ Zhodino players
FC Neman Grodno players
FC Dynamo Brest players
FC Rostov players
FC Kolos Kovalivka players
Warta Poznań players
FC Orenburg players
PAS Lamia 1964 players
Belarusian Premier League players
Russian Premier League players
Ukrainian Premier League players
Ekstraklasa players
Belarusian expatriate footballers
Expatriate footballers in Russia
Belarusian expatriate sportspeople in Russia
Expatriate footballers in Ukraine
Belarusian expatriate sportspeople in Ukraine
Expatriate footballers in Poland
Belarusian expatriate sportspeople in Poland
Expatriate footballers in Greece
Belarusian expatriate sportspeople in Greece